The 2013 Dubai World Cup was a horse race held at Meydan Racecourse on Saturday 30 March 2013. It was the 18th running of the Dubai World Cup.

The winner was Team Valor, Arrowfield Stud & Darley Stud's Animal Kingdom, a five-year-old chestnut entire horse trained in the United States by Graham Motion and ridden by Joel Rosario. Animal Kingdom's victory was the first in the race for his jockey, trainer and owners.

Animal Kingdom had been the American Champion Three-Year-Old Male Horse in 2011 when his wins included the Kentucky Derby but injury problems restricted him to only five races in almost twenty-three months before he competed in Dubai. In the World Cup he started the 11/2 third favourite and won by two lengths and four and three quarter lengths from the British-trained challengers Red Cadeaux and Planteur. The 5/2 favourite Hunter's Light finished seventh of the twelve runners.

Race details
 Sponsor: Emirates Airline
 Purse: £6,134,969; First prize: £3,680,981
 Surface: Tapeta
 Going: Standard
 Distance: 10 furlongs
 Number of runners: 12
 Winner's time: 2:03.21

Full result

 Abbreviations: nse = nose; nk = neck; shd = short head; hd = head

Winner's details
Further details of the winner, Animal Kingdom
 Sex: Stallion
 Foaled: 20 March 2008
 Country: United States
 Sire: Leroidesanimaux; Dam: Dalicia (Acatenango)
 Owner: Arrowfield Stud & Team Valor
 Breeder: Team Valor

References

Dubai World Cup
Dubai World Cup
Dubai World Cup
Dubai World Cup